Hypostomus topavae is a species of catfish in the family Loricariidae. It is native to South America, where it occurs in the Paraná River drainage, including the Rio Grande basin. The species is very large for a loricariid, reaching 70 cm (27.6 inches) SL.

References 

topavae
Fish of South America
Fish described in 1969